Glenn McDonald (born March 18, 1952) is an American retired professional basketball player. He played three seasons for the Boston Celtics and the Milwaukee Bucks before going overseas most notably in the Philippines,  with the U/Tex Wranglers in the early-80's. He averaged 4.2 points in 146 games played in his NBA career.

He played a huge role in Game 5 of the 1976 NBA Finals, scoring eight points in the third overtime period as the Celtics won 128-126 before eventually winning the championship in six games.

After winning the title with Boston, McDonald was cut by the Celtics. He was later picked up by Don Nelson to play for the Milwaukee Bucks to replace an injured Fred Carter. McDonald was again cut after Carter was able to play, then was signed to play for Alvik BK in Sweden.

In the Philippines, McDonald was instrumental in U/Tex's 1980 PBA Open Conference championship against Toyota Tamaraws. He scored two free-throws to send the fifth game into overtime after Toyota led by four with 16 seconds left in regulation. U/Tex eventually won the championship, 99–98. In 1981, he became the head coach of the U/Tex franchise after playing for the franchise for three consecutive seasons.

McDonald was an assistant coach for the Los Angeles Sparks of the WNBA, and served as head of intramurals in his alma mater Long Beach State.

Career statistics

NBA

Regular season

|-
| align="left" | 1974–75
| align="left" | Boston
| 62 || - || 6.4 || .385 || - || .757 || 1.1 || 0.4 || 0.1 || 0.1 || 2.7
|-
| style="text-align:left;background:#afe6ba;" | 1975–76†
| align="left" | Boston
| 75 || - || 13.6 || .419 || - || .714 || 1.8 || 0.9 || 0.5 || 0.3 || 5.6
|-
| align="left" | 1976–77
| align="left" | Milwaukee
| 9 || - || 8.8 || .235 || - || .750 || 1.3 || 0.8 || 0.4 || 0.0 || 2.1
|- class="sortbottom"
| style="text-align:center;" colspan="2"| Career
| 146 || - || 10.2 || .400 || - || .732 || 1.5 || 0.7 || 0.3 || 0.2 || 4.2
|}

Playoffs

|-
| align="left" | 1974–75
| align="left" | Boston
| 6 || - || 5.0 || .167 || - || .333 || 1.0 || 0.3 || 0.2 || 0.0 || 0.8
|-
| style="text-align:left;background:#afe6ba;" | 1975–76†
| align="left" | Boston
| 13 || - || 5.2 || .308 || - || .833 || 0.6 || 0.3 || 0.1 || 0.0 || 1.6
|- class="sortbottom"
| style="text-align:center;" colspan="2"| Career
| 19 || - || 5.2 || .263 || - || .667 || 0.7 || 0.3 || 0.1 || 0.0 || 1.4
|}

PBA

References

External links
 Career NBA Statistics
 McDonald nominated to PBA Hall of Fame

1952 births
Living people
08 Stockholm Human Rights players
African-American basketball players
American expatriate basketball people in the Philippines
American expatriate basketball people in Sweden
American men's basketball coaches
American men's basketball players
Basketball players from Illinois
Boston Celtics draft picks
Boston Celtics players
Long Beach State Beach men's basketball players
Milwaukee Bucks players
People from Kewanee, Illinois
U/Tex Wranglers coaches
Philippine Basketball Association imports
Small forwards
Shooting guards
U/Tex Wranglers players
Jefferson High School (Los Angeles) alumni
Los Angeles Sparks coaches
Alviks BK players
21st-century African-American people
20th-century African-American sportspeople